In enzymology, a leucine N-acetyltransferase is an enzyme that catalyzes the chemical reaction

acetyl-CoA + L-leucine  CoA + N-acetyl-L-leucine

Thus, the two substrates of this enzyme are acetyl-CoA and L-leucine, whereas its two products are CoA and N-acetyl-L-leucine.

This enzyme belongs to the family of transferases, specifically those acyltransferases transferring groups other than aminoacyl groups.  The systematic name of this enzyme class is acetyl-CoA:L-leucine N-acetyltransferase. This enzyme is also called leucine acetyltransferase.

References

 

EC 2.3.1
Enzymes of unknown structure